Charles Kellogg may refer to:

 Charles Kellogg (congressman) (1773–1842), U.S. Representative from New York
 Charles Kellogg (cross-country skier) (1940-2015), American Olympic skier
 Charles Kellogg (naturalist) (1868–1949), vaudeville performer and campaigner for the protection of the giant sequoias
 Charles Kellogg (state senator) (1839–1903), New York politician